In the early days of telephony, companies used manual telephone switchboards, and switchboard operators connected calls by inserting a pair of phone plugs into the appropriate jacks. They were gradually phased out and replaced by automated systems, first those allowing direct dialing within a local area, then for long-distance and international direct dialing.

Description
A typical telephone switchboard has a vertical panel containing an array of jacks with a desk in front. The desk has a row of switches and two rows of plugs attached to cables that retract into the desk when not in use. Each pair of plugs was part of a cord circuit with a switch associated that let the operator participate in the call or ring the circuit for an incoming call. Each jack had a light above it that lit when the customer's telephone receiver was lifted (the earliest systems required the customer to hand-crank a magneto to alert the central office and, later, to "ring off" the completed call). Lines from the central office were usually arranged along the bottom row. Before the advent of operator distance dialing and customer direct dial (DDD) calling, switchboard operators would work with their counterparts in the distant central office to complete long-distance calls. Switchboard operators are typically required to have very strong communication skills.

Before the advent of automatic exchanges, an operator's assistance was required for anything other than calling telephones across a shared party line. Callers spoke to an operator at a central office who then connected a cord to the proper circuit in order to complete the call. Being in complete control of the call, the operator was in a position to listen to private conversations. Automatic, or dial, systems were developed in the 1920s to reduce labor costs as usage increased, and to ensure privacy to the customer. As phone systems became more sophisticated, less direct intervention by the telephone operator was necessary to complete calls. With the development of computerized telephone dialing systems, many telephone calls which previously required a live operator can be placed automatically by the calling party without additional human intervention.

As well as the people that were employed by the public networks, operators were required at private branch exchanges (PBX) to answer incoming telephone calls and connect them to the correct extension. Today, most large organizations have direct-dial extensions.  Smaller workplaces may have an automated system which allows callers to enter the extension of the called party, or a receptionist who answers calls and performs operator duties.  Depending on the employment setting, the roles and level of responsibilities of a PBX operator can vary greatly, from performing wake-up calls in a hotel to coordinating emergency responses, dispatching, and overhead paging in hospitals. Operators employed in healthcare settings have other duties, such as data entry, greeting patients and visitors, taking messages, triaging, or acting as an after hours answering service. Experienced, well-trained operators generally command a higher salary.

History

In January 1878 George Willard Croy became the world's first telephone operator when he started working for the Boston Telephone Dispatch company.

Emma Nutt became the first female telephone operator on 1 September 1878 when she started working for the Boston Telephone Dispatch company, because the attitude and behaviour of the teenage boys previously employed as operators was unacceptable. Emma was hired by Alexander Graham Bell and, reportedly, could remember every number in the telephone directory of the New England Telephone Company. More women began to replace men within this sector of the workforce for several reasons. The companies observed that women were generally more courteous to callers, and women's labor was cheap in comparison to men's. Specifically, women were paid from one half to one quarter of a man's salary.
In the United States, any switchboard operator employed by an independently owned public telephone company which had not more than seven hundred and fifty stations was excluded from the Equal Pay Act of 1963.

Harriot Daley became the first telephone switchboard operator at the United States Capitol in 1898.

Julia O'Connor, a former telephone operator, led the Telephone Operators' Strike of 1919 and the Telephone Operators' Strike of 1923 against New England Telephone Company on behalf of the IBEW Telephone Operators' Department for better wages and working conditions. In the 1919 strike, after five days, Postmaster General Burleson agreed to negotiate an agreement between the union and the telephone company, resulting in an increase in pay for the operators and recognition of the right to bargain collectively. However, the 1923 strike was called off after less than a month without achieving any of its goals.

Women of the Signal Corps Female Telephone Operators Unit, American bilingual female switchboard operators in World War I, were known colloquially as Hello Girls and were not formally recognized for their military service until 1978.

In 1983, in Bryant Pond, Maine, Susan Glines became the last switchboard operator for a hand-crank phone when that exchange was converted. Manual central office switchboards continued in operation at rural points like Kerman, California, and Wanaaring, New South Wales, as late as 1991, but these were central-battery systems with no hand-cranked magnetos.

See also
 Operator assistance (includes access numbers)
 Private branch exchange
 Telephone operator (disambiguation)
 Telephone switchboard

References

External links

Business occupations
Obsolete occupations